Anna Goldmann Hirschler-Forstenheim (21 September 1836, Agram – 19 October 1889, Bad Vöslau) was an Austrian writer and poet.

Biography
She was born to Jewish parents Rosine and Moshe (Moritz) Goldmann in Agram, Croatia. She learned to read and write from her mother, and was later sent to a private secondary school for girls.

In 1867, she moved to Vienna and married banker and railway entrepreneur Samuel (later Georg) Hirschler, with whom she bore three children, Klara (1868), Dorothea (1869), and Otto Israel (1872). There she founded the Society of Women Writers and Artists, of which she was the treasurer. Soon after her sister Luise's marriage to German Hispanist Johannes Fastenrath in 1881, she and her family left the Jewish community, converted to Roman Catholicism, and changed their surname to Forstenheim.

Her son Otto died at the Łódź Ghetto in the Holocaust in December 1941.

Publications
Forstenheim's first-known published work was Caterina Cornaro (1875), a historical drama in five acts on the life of the last monarch of Cyprus.

Partial works

References
  

1836 births
1889 deaths
Austrian people of Croatian-Jewish descent
Writers from Zagreb
Converts to Roman Catholicism from Judaism
German-language writers
Austrian women poets
19th-century Austrian poets
19th-century Austrian Jews